Mohammed Hassan Damaj (1938 - 2018) was a Yemeni politician. He was a member of Islah Party and served as Minister of Local Administration.

Career 
He was born in 1938 in Ibb. He was former Minister of Local Administration in the Government of Yemen from 1994 to 1997. He served as governor of al-Bayda and from 2012 to 2014 governor of Amran Governorate and in 2014 he was appointed as a member of Shura Council. ِHe was detained by the Houthis after they stormed and seized the capital Sanaa in 2014. He was released six months later.

References 

1938 births
2018 deaths
Local administration ministers of Yemen
Governors of Al Bayda Governorate
Governors of Amran Governorate
People from Ibb Governorate
20th-century Yemeni politicians
21st-century Yemeni politicians
Al-Islah (Yemen) politicians
Prisoners and detainees of Yemen
Politicians imprisoned during the Yemeni Civil War (2014–present)
Politicians arrested in Yemen